Gonobahini ( "People's Army") was the armed wing of the Jatiya Samajtantrik Dal. The group was mainly composed of former Mukti Bahini members from the 1971 Bangladesh Liberation War.

History
In 1972, a section of the Bangladesh Chhatra League, the student wing of the Bangladesh Awami League split to form the Jatiyo Samajtantrik Dal, led by Serajul Alam Khan.

The party called for establishing socialism through an armed revolution. As a result, the Gonobahini was formed and led a violent insurgency against the government of Sheikh Mujibur Rahman. In 1974, Hasanul Haq Inu led a group of armed men to attack the residence of then home minister Mansur Ali, which resulted in a massacre. The Gonobahini is also accused of killing numerous Bangladesh Chhatra League and Awami League members.

Disbandment
When Ziaur Rahman was freed by members of the Gonobahini, Ziaur Rahman realized that the disorder set off by them in the  mutiny had to be suppressed firmly if discipline was to be restored in the Bangladesh Army. Ziaur Rahman declared martial law, cracked down on the Jatiyo Samajtantrik Dal and Gonobahini, Abu Taher was sentenced to death and other party figures had various terms of imprisonment slapped on them.

Criticism
In 2016, Bangladesh Awami League general secretary Syed Ashraful Islam remarked that Jatiya Samajtantrik Dal and Gonobahini had created the political atmosphere that led to the assassination of Sheikh Mujibur Rahman. Opposition party leaders also hold its activities responsible for Sheikh Mujib's killing. Other opposition figures have called it "the Al Qaeda of its day."

See also
Lal Bahini

References

1972 establishments in Bangladesh
Communism in Bangladesh
Military wings of socialist parties
Far-left politics
Communist terrorism
Terrorism in Bangladesh